Antonín Dvořák composed his String Quartet No. 13 in G major, Op. 106, (B. 192), between November 11 and December 9, 1895. 1895 was an eventful year for him: he returned to Europe from America in April, and his sister-in-law (who had been his first love) died in May.  Upon finishing No. 13, he took back up his No. 14 (Op. 105) in A-flat major, which he had begun before this quartet and finished it on December 30 of that year. The quartet in G major was given its first performance by the Bohemian Quartet in Prague, on October 9, 1896.

Structure
The string quartet contains four movements and lasts around 35 minutes.  The movements are as follows:

(Dvořák's works have a confusing history of conflicting opus numbers, and so Jarmil Burghauser catalogued them more consistently in his book Antonín Dvořák; thematický katalog, bibliografie, přehled života a díla (Antonín Dvořák: Thematic Catalog, Bibliography, Life and Work), first published in 1960. It is because of this that Antonín Dvořák's compositions have Burghauser numbers used sometimes to identify them, with 192 used for this quartet.)

References

Sources (Hardcopy)
Notes to the Chilingirian Quartet recording of the Quartet, made in 1991 (Chandos 8874)
Dvořák, Antonín. Five Late String Quartets. New York: Dover Publications, 1986. . Reprint of N. Simrock of Berlin publications - string quartets nos. 10–14 originally published 1879-96.

External links
List of Dvořák Chamber works with Burghauser numbers
Recording by the Huberman Quartet (archived on the Wayback Machine on 2006-08-31)

Dvorak 13
1895 compositions
Compositions in G major